The fourth edition of the CCCF Championship was held in Guatemala.

Final standings

Results

References

CCCF Championship
CCCF Championship, 1960
CCCF
CCCF Championship
CCCF Championship
International association football competitions hosted by Guatemala
CCCF Championship
CCCF Championship
Sports competitions in Guatemala City
20th century in Guatemala City